Charles Turner may refer to:

Politicians

American 
Charles E. Turner (politician) (1886–1936), American real estate developer and mayor of Dallas, Texas
Charles H. Turner (attorney) (1936–2018), U.S. Attorney for Oregon
Charles Henry Turner (U.S. Representative) (1861–1913), U.S. Representative from New York
Charles W. Turner (attorney) (1846–1907), Adjutant General of Montana
Charles Turner Jr. (1760–1839), U.S. Representative from Massachusetts
Chuck Turner (1941–2019), Boston councilor

British 
Charles Turner (MP) (1803–1875), MP for Liverpool, South Lancashire and South West Lancashire
Sir Charles Turner, 1st Baronet, of Warham (1666–1738), British Member of Parliament for King's Lynn, 1695–1738
Sir Charles Turner, 1st Baronet, of Kirkleatham (c. 1727–1783), British Member of Parliament for York, 1768–1783
Sir Charles Turner, 2nd Baronet (1773–1810), British Member of Parliament for Hull, 1796–1802

Canadian 
Charles Turner (Canadian politician) (1916–1993), Liberal MP for London East, then Senator from Ontario

Arts 
Charles Henry Turner (painter) (1848–1908), American painter
Charles Yardley Turner (1850–1918), American painter
Charles Turner (engraver) (1774–1857), English engraver
Charles Tennyson Turner (1808–1879), British poet
Charles Turner (English composer) (1907–1977), minor English composer, who took the last pre-war photographs of Hitler

Charles Turner (musician) (1936–2006), American jazz trumpeter

Sciences
Charles E. Turner (botanist) (1945–1997), American botanist
Charles Henry Turner (zoologist) (1867–1923), American zoologist, early pioneer in the field of insect behavior
Charles Turner (engineer) (1901–1994), New Zealand mechanical and civil engineer, engineering administrator and consultant

Sports
Charles Turner (Australian cricketer) (1862–1944), Australian cricketer
Charles Turner (English cricketer) (1862–1926), English cricketer
Charles Turner (water polo) (born 1953), Australian water polo player in the 1980 and 1984 Olympics
Charlie Turner (Canadian football) (born 1944), Canadian football player
Charlie Turner (footballer) (born 1910), Irish association footballer

Other people
Charles Turner (British Army officer) (died 1826), British soldier and colonial administrator
Charles W. Turner (Medal of Honor) (1921–1950), American soldier and Medal of Honor recipient
Charles Turner (bishop) (1842–1923), suffragan Bishop of Islington
Charles Turner (merchant) (1773?–1856), British businessman, now known as a collector and gardener
Charles Arthur Turner (1833–1907), British jurist